Madrona Island, formerly also known as Arbutus Island, is an island in the Carey Group, located southeast of Crease Island in the Johnstone Strait region of the Central Coast of British Columbia, Canada.

Name origin
Madrona comes from the Spanish language madroño, referring to any of several evergreen trees (genus Arbutus) of the heath family.  The Pacific Arbutus is common throughout the South Coast of British Columbia.

See also
List of islands of British Columbia
Madrona (disambiguation)

References

Islands of British Columbia
Central Coast of British Columbia